Kim Hill may refer to:
 Kim Hill (broadcaster) (born Fiona Hill, 1955), British-born New Zealand broadcaster
 Kim Hill (singer) (born 1963), American Christian country singer-songwriter
 Kim Hill (soul musician) (born 1972), American soul vocalist, formerly of the Black Eyed Peas
 Kimberly Hill (born 1989), American volleyball player
 Kim Hill, victim in 1978 of attempted murder by Mick Philpott
 Kim Hill (19662011), daughter of American football player Fred Hill and the inspiration for the Ronald McDonald House charity

See also